Hyalophora gloveri, or Glover's silkmoth, is a moth of the family Saturniidae. The species was  first described by Ferdinand Heinrich Hermann Strecker in 1872. It is found in the Rocky Mountain states, the western parts of the northern Great Plains, and the Canadian prairie provinces, north-west to at least central Alberta. It is also found in northern Mexico.

It is considered a subspecies of Hyalophora columbia by several authorities.

The wingspan is about 100 mm.

The larvae feed on Shepherdia argentea, Elaeagnus angustifolia, Salix species, etc.

Subspecies
Hyalophora gloveri gloveri
Hyalophora gloveri nokomis

External links

Fauske, Gerald M. (April 12, 2002). "Hyalophora gloveri (Strecker 1872)". Moths of North Dakota. Retrieved November 11, 2018.

Hyalophora
Moths described in 1872
Taxa named by Herman Strecker